Lasioglossum punctatissimum is a Palearctic species of sweat bee.

References

External links
Images representing  Lasioglossum punctatissimum

Hymenoptera of Europe
punctatissimum
Insects described in 1853